The 2019–20 Arab Club Champions Cup preliminary round began on 18 August and ended on 25 August 2019.

A total of 8 teams competed in the preliminary round of the 2019–20 Arab Club Champions Cup to decide the 2 remaining places in the first knockout stage.

All times are WAT (UTC+1), as listed by UAFA.

Teams
The draw for the preliminary round was held on 27 July 2019, shortly before the first round draw.

Officials

Referees
 Samir Guezzaz (Morocco)
 Saad Khalefah (Kuwait)
 Amin Omar (Egypt)
 Qassim Al-Hatmi (Oman)
 Ammar Mahfoodh (Bahrain)
 Ahmed Faisal Al-Ali (Jordan)
 Feras Taweel (Syria)
 Majed Al-Shamrani (Saudi Arabia)
 Hamad Al-Ali (United Arab Emirates)
 Adel Ali Al-Naqbi (United Arab Emirates)

Assistant Referees
 Mustapha Akerdad (Morocco)
 Humoud Al Sahli (Kuwait)
 Samir Gamal Saad Mohamed (Egypt)
 Abdullah Al-Shammakhi (Oman)
 Salah Al-Janahi (Bahrain)
 Abd Alsalam Halawah (Palestine)
 Omar Ali Al Jamal (Saudi Arabia)
 Hesham Al-Refaei (Saudi Arabia)
 Jasem Al Ali (United Arab Emirates)
 Ali Al-Hasani (Yemen)

Format
In each group, teams played against each other on a neutral ground. The group winners advanced to the first knockout stage.

Tiebreakers
Teams are ranked according to points (3 points for a win, 1 point for a draw, 0 points for a loss), and if tied on points, the following tiebreaking criteria are applied, in the order given, to determine the rankings:
Goal difference in all group matches;
Goals scored in all group matches.

Summary

Group A

Group B

References

External links
UAFA Official website 

2019–20 Arab Club Champions Cup
2019–20 in African football
2019 in Asian football